Harry Grove (7 May 1862 – 7 February 1896) was a British tennis player in the early years of tennis.

Career
Grove first entered the Wimbledon men's singles in 1881, when he lost in round one.  Grove reached the semis in 1887, beating Herbert Wilberforce and Herbert Bowes-Lyon before losing to Herbert Lawford in four sets. In June 1886 he won the prestigious Northern Championships, defeating the American player James Dwight in 3 sets and again in 1887. In May 1887 he won the Scottish Championships defeating Patrick Bowes-Lyon in five sets. In 1888 he reached the final of the Scottish Championships for the second successive year where his opponent was Bowes-Lyon. At two sets all and one three down Grove retired. In 1891 at Wimbledon he overcame Ernest Meers before losing to Ernest Renshaw in the quarterfinals. He last entered Wimbledon in 1893, when he lost in the opening round. Grove died aged 33 in 1896.

References

1862 births
1896 deaths
19th-century male tennis players
English male tennis players
British male tennis players
Tennis people from Greater London